Mahawar may refer to:

 Alta (dye)
 Mahawar Koli, an Indian caste
 Mahawar Vaish, an Indian caste